Hebei University of Geosciences, or  Hebei GEO University, previously named Shijiazhuang University of Economics is a university in Shijiazhuang, Hebei, China.

It was founded in 1953 and is one of the five universities directly under the former Ministry of Geology. It is a university jointly established by the Ministry of Land and Resources and the People's Government of Hebei Province. It is a key provincial university.

In 1971, it began to recruit undergraduates as a college deployed by the Ministry of Geology and Mineral Resources of China, and was renamed the Hebei Institute of Geology.

The school employs 185 part-time professors and visiting professors, including 10 academicians. The school recruits students from all over the country. The total students are 19k to 20k with only 53 International students from Pakistan, Afghanistan, Ethiopia, Tanzania, Ghana,  Rwanda and Sudan.

The university hold a good rank and reputation across China .
There are two campuses of the university the North campus and the main Campus.
The university offers partial scholarships to the students .

References 

Universities and colleges in Hebei
Geology of China